The Aviators is a weekly Canadian television docuseries about aviation.  Hosted by Anthony Nalli, the program is a behind-the-scenes look at airplanes and the people who fly or work with them.

The series came from a column of aviation stories Nalli was writing, called “Close Calls.” The series premiered on the Global Television Network Saturday, September 4, 2010. It could also be seen on CHEK-TV in Canada and has been distributed to all 356 Public Broadcasting Stations in the United States for broadcast in numerous markets starting in September 2010. The series was broadcast overseas on Discovery Channel Asia starting in spring 2010. The series became available on Hulu in February 2011.  It began airing its ninth season in May 2021.

In its third season, Mötley Crüe lead singer Vince Neil was featured trying to earn his pilot's license.

References

Article in AOPA Pilot Magazine
Article in Park Rapids Enterprise
Article in General Aviation News

External links
 

2010 American television series debuts
2010 Canadian television series debuts
2010s American documentary television series
2010s Canadian documentary television series
2020s American documentary television series
2020s Canadian documentary television series
Documentary television series about aviation
English-language television shows